</noinclude>
The list of city flags lists the flags of cities. Most of the city flags are based on the coat of arms or emblems of its city itself, and city flags can be also used by the coat of arms and emblems on its flag. Most of the city flags are flown outside town halls and councils.

Due to its size, the list is split into continents:
List of city flags in Africa
List of base flags in Antarctica
List of city flags in Asia
List of city flags in Europe
List of city flags in North America
List of city flags in Oceania
List of city flags in South America


Flags of the largest cities 
Cities with metropolitan areal populations of five million; largest cities without its own city flag are not included.

See also

 Flags of country subdivisions
 Gallery of flags of dependent territories
 Hanseatic flags

Notes

External links

 The Best City Flags - WorldAtlas

 
Flags